Stan Wattles (born July 24, 1961 in Glen Cove, New York), is a former driver in the Indy Racing League.  He raced in the 1996–2001 seasons with 19 career starts, including the Indianapolis 500 in 1998–2000.  He placed 8th in two races, and led his 2 laps in his first, in 1996 at Walt Disney World Speedway, but never led in his other contests. In the 1999 VisionAire 500K at Lowe's Motor Speedway, Wattles was involved in a crash that killed three spectators when debris from his car cleared the fence, and 18 laps later, the race was cancelled.

Racing record

SCCA National Championship Runoffs

American Open Wheel
(key)

IndyCar

Indy 500 results

References

External links
Driver DB Profile

1961 births
Living people
IndyCar Series drivers
Indianapolis 500 drivers
Atlantic Championship drivers
Sportspeople from Glen Cove, New York
Racing drivers from New York (state)
SCCA National Championship Runoffs winners